Sant'Agostino was a comune (municipality) in the Province of Ferrara in the Italian region Emilia-Romagna, located about  north of Bologna and about  west of Ferrara. From 1 January 2017 the comune was unified with Mirabello and the new municipality took the name of Terre del Reno.

Earthquake victims
Two workers died in a Sant'Agostino ceramics factory when the building collapsed during an earthquake which hit the region in the early morning on May 20, 2012.

The following day the affected region, which extended to Lombardy and Veneto, experienced a succession of aftershocks, the strongest of which took place in the early afternoon and was itself rated at 5.1 on the Richter scale.

References

Cities and towns in Emilia-Romagna